Ljutomer railway station serves the municipality of Ljutomer, Slovenia. It was opened in 1890, and became a junction station in 1924.

External links 
Official site of the Slovenian railways 

Railway stations in Slovenia
Railway stations opened in 1890